17492 Hippasos  is a Jupiter trojan and member of the Ennomos family from the Trojan camp, approximately  in diameter. It was discovered on 10 December 1991, by astronomer Freimut Börngen at the Karl Schwarzschild Observatory in Tautenburg, Germany. The Jovian asteroid belongs to the 80 largest Jupiter trojans and has a rotation period of 17.8 hours. It was named after the Trojan prince Hippasus (Hippasos) from Greek mythology.

Orbit and classification 

Hippasos is a Jovian asteroid in the so-called Trojan camp, located in the  Lagrangian point, 60° behind Jupiter, orbiting in a 1:1 resonance with the Gas Giant .

It orbits the Sun at a distance of 4.8–5.5 AU once every 11 years and 8 months (4,262 days; semi-major axis of 5.14 AU). Its orbit has an eccentricity of 0.07 and an inclination of 29° with respect to the ecliptic. The body's observation arc begins with a precovery published by the Digitized Sky Survey and taken at the Siding Spring Observatory in September 1977, more than 14 years prior to its official discovery observation at Tautenburg.

Asteroid family 

Hippasos is a member of the Ennomos family, one of few known Jovian asteroid families, named after 4709 Ennomos (also see ). A different HCM analysis finds this asteroid to be the parent body of its own Hippasos family, first described by Jakub Rozehnal and Miroslav Brož in 2014. According to the astronomers' model, the Hippasos family consists of 104 known members, and was formed 1 to 2 billion years ago. The extrapolated size of the original body is between 67 and 168 kilometers, which is strongly influenced by the amount of possible interlopers into the family.

Naming 

This minor planet was named from Greek mythology after the Trojan prince Hippasus (Hippasos). The son of King Priam supported Aeneas in the Trojan War. The official naming citation was published by the Minor Planet Center on 9 March 2001.

Physical characteristics 

Hippasos is an assumed C-type asteroid, while most larger Jupiter trojans are D-type asteroids.

Rotation period 

In December 2013, a rotational lightcurve of Hippasos was obtained from photometric observations by Robert Stephens at the Center for Solar System Studies in Landers, California. Lightcurve analysis gave a well-defined rotation period of  hours with a brightness amplitude of 0.21 magnitude.

Diameter and albedo 

According to the survey carried out by the NEOWISE mission of NASA's Wide-field Infrared Survey Explorer, Hippasos measures 53.98 kilometers in diameter and its surface has an albedo 0.066, while the Collaborative Asteroid Lightcurve Link assumes a standard albedo for a carbonaceous asteroid of 0.057 and calculates a diameter of 55.67 kilometers based on an absolute magnitude of 10.0.

Notes

References

External links 
 Asteroid Lightcurve Database (LCDB), query form (info )
 Dictionary of Minor Planet Names, Google books
 Discovery Circumstances: Numbered Minor Planets (15001)-(20000) – Minor Planet Center
 
 

017492
017492
Discoveries by Freimut Börngen
Named minor planets
19911210